A protopope, or protopresbyter, is a priest of higher rank in the Eastern Orthodox and the Byzantine Catholic Churches, generally corresponding to Western Christianity's archpriest or the Latin Church's dean.

History
The rights and duties of these dignitaries have varied to some extent at different times and in different local churches. Roughly, the titles archpriest (in Greek  archipresbyteros), protoiereus ( protoiereus,  protopresbyteros), protopope may be taken as meaning the same thing, though they have occasionally been distinguished.
 
The general idea is that the archpriest has the highest rank in his order; he comes immediately after the bishop. In the fifth century he appears as head of the college of priests, as the bishop's delegate for certain duties of visitation and canonical judgment, as his representative in case of absence or death (sede vacante). He therefore combined the offices of the Roman Catholic dean of the chapter, vicar-general and vicar capitular. The title recurs constantly in the Early Middle Ages.
 
At imperial Constantinople there was an elaborately organized court of ecclesiastical persons around the Ecumenical Patriarch, whose various places in choir when the patriarch celebrated are given in the Euchologion together with a statement of their duties. Among these the protopope had the first place on the left. "The protopope stands above the left choir when the pontiff celebrates, he gives to him [the pontiff] Holy Communion and in the same way the pontiff to the protopope and he has all first places [τὰ πρωτεῖα πάντα -ta proteia panta] in the church" (Goar, 225). Under him the "second one" (ὁ δευτερεύων ho deutereuon), takes his place in his absence (ibid.). So also Leo Allatius's list, where it is said further that: "he holds the place [κρατῶν τόπον - kraton topon, as deputy] of the pontiff" (ibid., 229). He is promoted by presentation to the patriarch, who lays his hand on him with prayer, and the clergy cry "axios" (ἄξιος) three times (the rite from Allatius is given by Goar, 238). Goar notes that the protopope, at least to some extent, succeeded to the place of the chorepiscopus. He could ordain lectors; at concelebrations where no bishop is present he presided and said the ekphonesis (ἐκφώνησις - exclamations chanted aloud at the end of prayers and litanies). In the bishop's absence he took his place as president, and had jurisdiction over his fellow-clergy. George Kodinos (fourteenth century) says of the protopope: "he is first in the tribunal [τοῦ βήματος - tou bematos, in authority] holding the second place after the pontiff" (De Officiis, I, quoted by Goar 237).

Distinct from the official of the patriarchal court, though bearing the same title, were the protopopes in the country parishes. They correspond to Catholic rural deans, having delegate episcopal jurisdiction for minor cases, from which appeal may be made to the bishop. So Theodore Balsamon (twelfth century): "It is forbidden by the canons that there should be bishops in small towns and villages, and because of this they ordain for these priests who are protopopes and chorepiscopi" (Syntagma, III, 142). There are cases in which a protopope in a remote place has episcopal jurisdiction, but not orders, like some vicars Apostolic, or the archpriests in England from 1599 to 1621. In such cases they are distinguished from archpriests and have such officials under them (so the introduction to Nicholas Bulgaris' "Sacred Catechism", Venice, 1681).

In modern times the Orthodox (and Eastern Catholic) title of protopope often means hardly more than a complimentary title conveying a certain rank and precedence with sometimes a few unimportant rights. Often in a church that has several priests (as we should say a rector and curates) the first (rector) is called protopope. In imperial Russia, royal Bulgaria, royal Rumania and Habsburg Austria the protopopes had authority over a district containing several parishes which they had to visit occasionally, representing for the clergy the court of first instance. In Orthodox Hungary and Transylvania there are protopresbyterates (eparchies), in which the protopope is elected by clergy and people and rules under the bishop. In these cases he may be compared to our rural deans. Such an office is the highest to which a married Orthodox priest may aspire, since bishops are always monks. In Russia the protopope (protoierei) sometimes wears the Byzantine mitre (but without a cross atop it) and epigonation, but not the omophorion or sakkos.

Notes

References
Jacques Goar, Euchologion (Venice, 1730)
Bingham, Origines sive antiquitates ecclesiastic (London, 1723)
Milasch, Das Kirchenrecht der morgenländischen Kirche (2nd ed., Mostar, 1905)
Knie, Die russisch-schismatische Kirche (Graz, 1894).

External links

Ecclesiastical titles
Eastern Christian ecclesiastical offices